Dieter Lichtenberg (born 4 February 1949) is an East German sprint canoer who competed in the early 1970s. He finished seventh in the C-2 1000 m event at the 1972 Summer Olympics in Munich.

References
Sports-reference.com profile

1949 births
Canoeists at the 1972 Summer Olympics
German male canoeists
Living people
Olympic canoeists of East Germany
Place of birth missing (living people)